Ruhengeri, also known as Musanze or Muhoza, is the third largest city in Rwanda and the capital of Musanze District in the Northern Province of Rwanda. The city has a population of 135,000 as of the 2022 census.

Name 
Some sources now refer to the city itself as Musanze, after the district in which it lies within. This has to do with the adopted policy of renaming Rwanda cities, which was done to eliminate memories of the past and to install new administrations in the country.

Geography 
Ruhengeri lies near the twin lakes of Lake Burera and Lake Ruhondo and is the gateway city to Volcanoes National Park and the famous mountain gorillas in the north-western part of the country. 

The city's proximity to the Volcanoes National Park has made it a popular tourist destination with several restaurants and hotels mainly aimed at visitors to the national park.

Notable institutions 
Ruhengeri is also home to the Institute of Applied Sciences (INES-Ruhengeri). INES-Ruhengeri was established in 2003 in collaboration with the  Catholic Diocese of Ruhengeri.

The city is served by the Ruhengeri Airport.

Notable people 

 Protais Zigiranyirazo, former governor of the Ruhengeri prefecture and accused war criminal

References 

Northern Province, Rwanda
Populated places in Rwanda